E. carnea may refer to:

 Eilema carnea, a Malagasy moth
 Eria carnea, a flowering plant
 Erica carnea, a flowering plant
 Erythrotrichia carnea, a red algae
 Eucalyptus carnea, a flowering plant